Hamdard University Bangladesh is a newly established private university in Bangladesh.

Academic departments
Faculty of Science, Engineering & Technology (FSET)
 Dept. of Mathematics
 Dept. of Electrical and Electronic Engineering
 Dept. of Computer Science and Engineering

Faculty of Business Administration(FBA)
 Dept. of Business Administration (major in Marketing, Management, Finance, Accounting)

Faculty of Arts & Social Science(FASS)
 Dept. of English
 Dept. of Economics

Faculty of Unani and Ayurvedic Medicine (FAUM)
 Dept. of Unani Medicine
 Dept. of Ayurvedic Medicine

Faculty of Health Sciences

 Dept. of Public Health

Courses

Undergraduate
 Bachelor of Science (Honours) in Mathematics
 Bachelor of Science (Honours) in Computer Science & Engineering
 Bachelor of Science (Honours) in Electrical & Electronics Engineering
 Bachelor of Business Administration (Major in Marketing)
 Bachelor of Business Administration (Management)
 Bachelor of Arts (Honours) in English
 Bachelor of Social Science (Honours) in Economics
 Bachelor of Unani Medicine and Surgery (BUMS)
 Bachelor of Ayurvedic Medicine and Surgery (BAMS)

Graduate
 Master of Business Administration (MBA) Regular-39 credit 
 Master of Business Administration (MBA) Regular-66 credit 
 Executive MBA (EMBA)-Management
 Master of Public Health (MPH)
 Master of Science in Mathematics

See also
 Hamdard Public College
Jamia Hamdard
Hamdard Public School

References

Universities and colleges in Bangladesh
2011 establishments in Bangladesh
Educational institutions established in 2011